Grand Prix motorcycle racing is the premier championship of motorcycle road racing, which has been divided into three classes since 1990: 125cc, 250cc and MotoGP. Classes that have been discontinued include 350cc, 50cc/80cc and sidecar. The 50/80cc referred to the size of the engines of the motorcycles that raced in that class. The Grand Prix Road Racing World Championship was established in 1949 by the sport's governing body, the Fédération Internationale de Motocyclisme (FIM), and is the oldest motorsport World Championship. The 50cc was introduced in 1962, 13 years after the start of the first world championships. The category was replaced by 80cc in 1984 and the class was subsequently discontinued in 1989.

Each season consisted of five to ten Grands Prix contested on closed circuits, as opposed to public roads. Points earned in these events counted toward the drivers' and constructors' World Championships. The driver's and constructor's championship were separate championships, but were based on the same point system. The points systems used in the championship varied over the years. The first championship in 1962 awarded points from first to sixth place; a point was also awarded for the rider who completed the fastest lap. The last championship in 1989 awarded points from first to fifteenth place. Results from all Grands Prix counted towards the championships; however, in some seasons only a certain number of results were counted.

Ángel Nieto won the most championships during his career with six. Stefan Dörflinger won the second most championships with four, and Hans-Georg Anscheidt and Jorge Martínez won the third most with three. Spanish riders won the most championships; four riders won a total of 12 championships. Swiss and German riders were second with four, while Ernst Degner won the inaugural championship in 1962. Manuel Herreros was the last champion before the class was discontinued in 1989.

Champions

 The "Season" column refers to the season the competition was held, and wikilinks to the article about that season.
 The "Margin" column refers to the margin of points by which the winner defeated the runner-up.

By season

Multiple champions

By constructor

By nationality

Footnotes

A.  The points awarded in the 1962 championship were 8 points for a win, with 6, 4, 3, 2 and 1 point from second place to sixth place.

B.  The points awarded to riders in the 1989 championship were 20 points for a win, with 17, 15, 13, 11, 10, 9, 8, 7, 6, 5, 4, 3, 2 and 1 point from second place to fifteenth place.

C.  Ángel Nieto and Jan de Vries finished the 1972 championship tied on 69 points. Nieto and de Vries had both won three Grands Prix and finished second three times. As a result, the championship was decided by adding up their times from the five races that the two had finished together. Nieto was declared the winner by 21.5 seconds.

References
Bibliography
 
 
 

General
 

Specific

50 80cc World Champions
Moto 050